Athletics events were contested at the 1965 Summer Universiade in Budapest, Hungary.

Medal summary

Men

Women

Medal table

References
World Student Games (Universiade - Men) - GBR Athletics
World Student Games (Universiade - Women) - GBR Athletics

Athletics at the Summer Universiade
Uni
1965 Summer Universiade